The 1972 Washington Huskies football team was an American football team that represented the University of Washington during the 1972 NCAA University Division football season.  In its 16th season under head coach Jim Owens, the team compiled an 8–3 record, finished in a tie for third place in the Pacific-8 Conference, and outscored its opponents by a combined total of 208 to 204.

Defensive back Bill Cahill and quarterback Sonny Sixkiller were the team captains, and defensive back Calvin Jones was selected as the team's most valuable player.
    
A top ten pick in the preseason, the Huskies were undefeated after five games and ranked twelfth in  but Sixkiller suffered ankle and knee injuries early in the Stanford game in  Quarterbacks Greg Collins, Dennis Fitzpatrick, and Mark Backman then led the offense, with losses at Stanford and  followed by consecutive wins over California and 

Sixkiller returned to the lineup for senior day at Husky Stadium on November 11 and Washington beat #8 UCLA, but dropped the Apple Cup to #20 Washington State at Spokane. The Pac-8 did not allow a second bowl team until the 1975 season.

Schedule

Roster

NFL Draft selections
Six University of Washington Huskies were selected in the 1973 NFL Draft, which lasted seventeen rounds with 442 selections.

References

External links
 Game program: Washington vs. Washington State at Spokane – November 18, 1972

Washington
Washington Huskies football seasons
Washington Huskies football